Volvo PV is a model name that Volvo used on a number of automobiles during the company's first forty years:

 1928-1929 Volvo PV4
 1929-1936 Volvo PV650 Series
 1935-1938 Volvo PV36
 1936-1945 Volvo PV51 Series
 1938-1958 Volvo PV800 Series
 1946-1950 Volvo PV60
 1947-1958 Volvo PV444
 1953-1960 Volvo PV445
 1958-1965 Volvo PV544

Volvo PV is also the short form for Volvo Personvagnar (dir.trans: Volvo person wagon), the Swedish name for Volvo Cars, as opposed to Volvo LV, or Volvo Lastvagnar (dir.trans: Volvo load wagon), the Swedish name for Volvo Trucks.

Gallery 

Volvo Cars